Idomacromia jillianae is a species of dragonfly in the family Corduliidae. It is endemic to Uganda.  Its natural habitat is subtropical or tropical moist lowland forests. It is threatened by habitat loss.

References

Sources

Corduliidae
Endemic fauna of Uganda
Insects of Uganda
Taxonomy articles created by Polbot